Besson is a commune in the Allier department in central France.

Population

Administration 
 2001–2014: Jean Pagnon
 2014–current: Frédéric Verdier

See also
Communes of the Allier department

References

Communes of Allier
Allier communes articles needing translation from French Wikipedia